Riva Fashion is a fashion brand specialized in clothing, footwear, accessories and perfumes for women, teenagers and kids. Riva Fashion operate in 6 countries across the GCC with over 75 stores and 5000 employees. The brand has a significant digital presence, with online and mobile application that attract the women to enjoy a friendly shopping experience with worldwide shipping. Riva Fashion Brand is owned by the Armada retail concept which was founded in Kuwait in 1973 by Al Tahan family.

History

Awards
Riva Fashion won 'Best in Apparel and Accessories’ in the Middle East at the World Branding Awards for 2016, 2017 and 2018.

Store count
Number of Riva Fashion offline stores as of 27 November 2021

 Kuwait: 19
 Saudi Arabia: 19
 United Arab Emirates: 14
 Qatar: 15
 Bahrain: 4
 Oman: 5

References

External links
Riva Fashion Stores in Middle East

Clothing brands of Kuwait
Clothing companies of Kuwait
Internet properties established in 2006
Kuwaiti companies established in 1997